Odintsovsky District is an administrative and municipal district (raion), one of the thirty-six in Moscow Oblast, Russia. It is located in the western central part of the oblast and borders with the federal city of Moscow in the east, Leninsky District in the southeast, Naro-Fominsky District in the south, Ruzsky District in the west, Istrinsky District in the north, and with Krasnogorsky District in the northeast. Its administrative center is the city of Odintsovo. Population: 316,696 (2010 Census);  The population of Odintsovo accounts for 43.9% of the district's total population. The city of Baikonur in Kazakhstan also belongs administratively to the district.

Geography
The Moskva River with its tributaries flow through the district.

History
The district was established on January 13, 1965.

Attractions
Major attractions include the Kubinka Tank Museum, Grebnevskaya Church, and the Main Cathedral of the Russian Armed Forces and the Vjazjomy estate manor house.

References

Notes

Sources

 
Districts of Moscow Oblast